Jordi López may refer to:

 Jordi López (cyclist) (born 1998), Spanish cyclist
 Jordi López (footballer) (born 1981), Spanish former footballer